Aino Bach (1 December 1901 – 6 August 1980) was an Estonian artist known for her engravings and her portrayals of Soviet-era femininity.

Biography 
Aino Bach was born in Koeru, Estonia in 1901. As a child, she lived in Narva, and attended secondary school in Siberia, before returning to Estonia in 1921. She studied painting at the Pallas Art School in Tartu under the supervision of Nikolai Triik, and engraving with Ado Vabbe, whom she shared socialist ideals with. In 1937, Bach married the painter Kaarel Liimand. She worked as a lecturer at her former art school (now renamed after Konrad Mägi) in 1940-1941.

In 1941, during the German occupation of Estonia, Bach was exiled in Yaroslav in the Soviet Union. There, she was an active member in the Union of Estonian Artists (ENSV Kunstnike Liidu), founded in 1943. She played a large role in the reorganization of Estonian artistic life with this organization. She was a mentor to fellow Estonian artist Evald Okas. Bach was awarded the State Prize of the Estonian SSR in 1947.

After the war, Bach settled in Tallinn. She was awarded People’s Artist of the Estonian SSR in 1961. Bach died in Tallinn on August 6, 1980.

Artistry 
Many of Bach's works portray women, representing many different settings and professions. Her style has been described as including both poetic realism and Socialist Realism. Many of her pieces were created using intaglio engraving techniques and she broadened the expressive abilities of the technique. She was praised to have a wealth of nuances and original style, utilizing metal point engraving, etching, and colored monotype, which she often used multiple of in her works. While some of Bach's art has been characterized as a product of Soviet propaganda, art critic  has argued that Bach, a genuine political leftist, used Soviet iconography as a means to portray women's participation in public life. Later in her career, Bach painted portraits of public figures including Debora Vaarandi.

References

Further reading 
 Bernstein Boris, Aino Bach, Tallinn: Eesti NSV Kunst, 1961

External links 
 Collection of Bach's works held in the Art Museum of Estonia's digital catalogue
 Image of Aino Bach at work, 1949 (in the photo collection of the Art Museum of Estonia)

1901 births
1980 deaths
People from Järva Parish
People from Kreis Jerwen
20th-century Estonian women artists
Estonian women illustrators
Estonian printmakers
Soviet women artists
Soviet artists
Women engravers
People's Artists of the Estonian Soviet Socialist Republic (visual arts)
Recipients of the Order of the Red Banner of Labour
Burials at Metsakalmistu
20th-century engravers